Carlton Gardens may refer to:
 Carlton Gardens, Melbourne, a World Heritage Site in Victoria, Australia
 Carlton Gardens Primary School, in Melbourne, Australia
 Carlton Gardens, a cul-de-sac at the west end of Carlton House Terrace, London, UK